KFCR (1490 AM) is a radio station broadcasting an adult contemporary format. Licensed to Custer, South Dakota, United States, the station serves the Rapid City area. The station is currently owned by Mt. Rushmore Broadcasting, Inc.

The station along with others owned by Mt. Rushmore Broadcasting filed for an extension of the special temporary authority in early 2015, due to staffing issues. It was reported that staff had unexpectedly resigned, and there was difficulty finding new employees.
In August 2016, the station reported to the FCC that it had resumed broadcasting.

References

External links

FCR